Professor Samuel Bruce McLaren (16 August 1876 – 13 August 1916) was an Australian mathematician and mathematical physicist. Joint winner of the Adams Prize in 1913 and Professor of Mathematics, University College, Reading from 1913 until his death during the Battle of the Somme.

Early life
McLaren was born in Yedo, near Tokyo, Japan, elder son of Rev. Samuel Gilfillan McLaren M.A. a Scottish missionary and later professor of sacred history and biblical literature at the Presbyterian Union Theological Seminary, and Marjory Millar McLaren née Bruce. The eldest child his siblings included Mary,  Charles McLaren (psychiatrist) (later a missionary to Korea), and Marjory.  In 1886, the family moved to Australia, where in 1889 his father became principal of Presbyterian Ladies' College, Melbourne. Samuel McLaren was educated at Brighton Grammar School and Scotch College, Melbourne, where he was dux in mathematics in 1893. He gained a scholarship at Ormond College, University of Melbourne, and qualified for the Bachelor of Arts degree at the end of 1896 with first class final honours, and the final honours and Wyselaskie scholarships in mathematics. He also shared the Dixon scholarship in natural philosophy. One of his teachers at the University stated in 1903 that McLaren was by far the ablest student he had met during his twelve years' tenure of office, and one whose ability should be sufficient to place him in a very conspicuous position as an original thinker.

Study in England
Moving to England in 1897, McLaren attended Trinity College, Cambridge and was elected into a major scholarship in 1899, and was third wrangler in the same year. Taking part 2 of the mathematical tripos in his third year, he was placed in the second division of the first class. He was awarded an Isaac Newton studentship in astronomy and physical optics in 1901, and graduated M.A. in 1905. Not absorbed by mathematics alone he was interested in philosophy, literature and art, and played football tennis and boxed.

Mathematical career
McLaren was lecturer in mathematics at University College, Bristol 1904–06. Then from 1906 until 1913 obtained a similar position at the University of Birmingham. Between 1911 and 1913 he wrote some important papers on radiation which were published in the Philosophical Magazine, and he presented some of the more fundamental parts of his work to the mathematical congress at Cambridge in 1912. John William Nicholson, professor of mathematics in the University of London, writing in 1918 said McLaren "undoubtedly anticipated Einstein and Abraham in their suggestion of a variable velocity of light, with the consequent expressions for the energy and momentum of the gravitational field". In 1913 he was made professor of mathematics at University College, Reading where he took much interest in the development of the young university. In 1913 he shared the, at the time, biennial Adams Prize of the University of Cambridge with Nicholson.

Late life
In 1914 he visited Australia with other members of the British Association for the Advancement of Science, and met his parents again shortly before his father died. The First World War broke out while he was in Australia, and on his return to England he enlisted and was given a commission as lieutenant in the Royal Engineers. Though he loathed bloodshed and was altogether out of his element he did valuable work in charge of signalling and electrical communications. 

During the Battle of the Somme, on 26 July 1916, near Abbeville, he was shot in the head while endeavouring to clear a pit of bombs threatened by a nearby fire. He returned a second time to continue this work, but was hit again. He was carried on a stretcher to the dressing station, on the way the bearers put the stretcher down for a minutes rest, and Lt. McLaren stood up, declaring he was too heavy and would walk. He collapsed and after a few days in hospital he died of his wounds on 13 August 1916. He was unmarried and was buried at Abbeville. 

Described as 'absolutely fearless and intrepid to an extent which made him both an anxiety to his brother officers and an inspiration to his men', one of the tragedies of his death was that it occurred before he published his papers and consequently much of his work was lost. His death and that of Henry Moseley were considered as perhaps the two most irreparable losses to British science caused by the First World War. Papers by McLaren were published posthumously as Scientific Papers (Cambridge, 1925) with a preface by Sir Joseph Larmor, a 'Personal Appreciation' by Prof. Hugh Walker and a reprint of an obituary by Prof. J. W. Nicholson. In it McLaren's best friend Prof. Walker wrote;

He bore the load of thoughts that passed the spheres 
Exile he bore, for duty must be done 
Few were his friends, and rarer still his peers 
Alone he stood, for genius lives alone.

	    
The world crashed round him ; and his soul, called back
From those "strange seas" whereon it voyaged still,
Faced humble tasks to shape and Empire's track
One hair's breadth nearer the Eternal Will.

	    
He died. But sure that spirit pure and high 
By death has made his own the immortal prize 
For always, in the Everlasting's eye,
The grandest virtue is self-sacrifice."

His brother Charles was a prominent psychiatrist and missionary to east Asia.

References

External links
Scientific papers ...including an Adams prize essay...by the late Samuel Bruce McLaren at Niels Bohr Library Book Catalog

Photograph available at; 

1876 births
1916 deaths
People educated at Brighton Grammar School
Royal Engineers officers
Mathematicians from Melbourne
British Army personnel of World War I
British military personnel killed in the Battle of the Somme
People educated at Scotch College, Melbourne
Military personnel from Melbourne
Academics of University College Bristol
University of Melbourne alumni
Australian people of Scottish descent
Alumni of Trinity College, Cambridge
Academics of the University of Birmingham
British expatriates in Japan